Izabela Yankova (born 23 June 2004) is a Bulgarian downhill mountain biker. Yankova won the 2021 UCI Mountain Bike World Championships in the Junior Women's category.
She is the first Bulgarian cyclist to win a World Championship event.
Yankova competed in the Women's High Performance Sport category at the IXS European Downhill Cup, clinching the series overall at the final in Maribor, Slovenia.

References

2004 births
Living people
Bulgarian female cyclists
Downhill mountain bikers